Mandela and de Klerk is a 1997 made-for-television drama film written by Richard Wesley and directed by Joseph Sargent. The film stars Sidney Poitier and Michael Caine. The film documents the negotiations between F.W. de Klerk and Nelson Mandela to end South African apartheid, and was nominated for numerous awards in 1997 and 1998. It originally premiered on Showtime on February 16, 1997.

Cast

References

External links 
 

Apartheid films
1997 television films
1997 films
1997 drama films
Films about Nelson Mandela
Cultural depictions of Nelson Mandela
Cultural depictions of Winnie Mandela
Cultural depictions of F. W. de Klerk
Films shot in South Africa
Films directed by Joseph Sargent
Showtime (TV network) films
American drama television films
1990s American films